Ranjana Deshmukh (1955 – March 3, 2000) was a popular Marathi actress in 1970s & '80s, famous on-screen as just Ranjana.

Life and career 
She is the daughter of Vatsala Deshmukh. Her aunt, Sandhya was married to V. Shantaram, who introduced her to the screen in  Chandanachi Choli Ang Ang Jaali (1975). She then starred in the lead role in Shantaram's next film, Jhunj. Ranjana won the state government award for best actress twice : Are Sansar Sansar (1980) and Gup Chup Gup Chup (1983). Her other key films include Sushila, Gondhalat Gondhal, Mumbaicha Faujdar, Bin Kamacha Navra, Khichdi, Chani, Jakhmi Vaghin, Bhujang and Ek Daav Bhutacha.

Ranjana made hit pairs at the box office with several noted Marathi film actors including Ashok Saraf, Avinash Masurekar, Shriram Lagoo, Kuldeep Pawar, Nilu Phule, Ravindra Mahajani, Raja Gosavi and others. Ranjana Deshmukh's career came to an abrupt end in 1987 in a car accident while she was on her way to Bangalore to shoot for Jhanjhaar. Ranjana's legs were paralysed in the accident. She was engaged to Ashok Saraf earlier. After her accident she was in a play named Fakt Ekdaach.

Filmography

Are Sansar Sansar
Asla Navara Nako Ga Bai
Bin Kamacha Navra
Bahuroopi
Baiko Asavi Ashi
Bhalu
Bhujang
Chandanachi Choli Ang Aang Jali
Chaani
Daivat
Devghar
Ek Daav Bhutacha
Galli te Dilli
Gondhalat Gondhal
Gupchup Gupchup
Halad kunku
Iye Marathiche Nagari
Jhakmi Vaghin
Jhanjhaar (1987)
Jhunj
Kela Ishara Jata Jata
Ashi Hi Banva Banvi
Lakshmi
Lakshmichi Paule
Mardani (1983)
Mumbaicha Faujdar
Sage Soyre
Sasu Varchadh Jawai
Sasurvashin
Savitri
Sushila

Death
Ranjana died of a heart attack at her residence at Parel in central Mumbai, India. She was 45. She is survived by her mother Vatsala Deshmukh, a noted character actress of her time and her aunt Sandhya, Hindi film actress and wife of V. Shantaram.

Zee Talkies paid tribute to Ranjana by showcasing her select movies on 3 March 2011. The government of Maharashtra has instituted an award in her memory.

See also
Marathi cinema

References

External links

1955 births
2000 deaths
Marathi actors
Filmfare Awards winners
Actresses in Marathi cinema
Actresses from Mumbai
20th-century Indian actresses